Jefferson Township is one of thirteen townships in Grant County, Indiana, United States. As of the 2010 census, its population was 5,839 and it contained 1,758 housing units.

History
The Cumberland Covered Bridge was listed on the National Register of Historic Places in 1978.

Geography
Lakes in this township include Dollar Lake. The streams of Branch Creek, Cane Run, Crawford Creek, Lake Branch, Mat Run, Round Run and Upland Drain run through this township.

Cities and towns
 Gas City (east edge)
 Upland
 Matthews

Adjacent townships
 Monroe Township (north)
 Washington Township, Blackford County (northeast)
 Licking Township, Blackford County (east)
 Washington Township, Delaware County (south)
 Fairmount Township (west)
 Mill Township (northwest)

Cemeteries
The township contains one cemetery, Shiloh.

Major highways

Education
Jefferson Township residents may obtain a free library card from the Barton Rees Pogue Memorial Public Library in Upland.

References
 
 United States Census Bureau cartographic boundary files

External links
 Indiana Township Association
 United Township Association of Indiana

Townships in Grant County, Indiana
Townships in Indiana